The Agusta scandal, alternatively known as the Agusta–Dassault Case, was a major political scandal which occurred in Belgium during the 1990s, based on allegations that two multinational companies had used bribery to secure large defence procurement contracts. The companies in question, Agusta and Dassault, bribed numerous political office-holders in 1988 in order to secure a large order of Agusta A109 helicopters and the contract for re-fitting Belgian F-16 Fighting Falcon fighter jets respectively. The scandal came to light during investigations into the death of the socialist politician André Cools in 1991 and an official enquiry was opened in 1993. Numerous senior figures in both Walloon and Flemish socialist parties were implicated, including the incumbent Secretary General of NATO Willy Claes who was forced to resign.

The Agusta scandal was the first of a series of highly publicised scandals in Belgium. It was followed by the revelations about the "Hormone Mafia", the Dioxin affair, and the Dutroux affair.

History

Investigation and exposure
The investigation into the purchase was started by the investigative team looking into the 1991 assassination of André Cools, a politician of the Francophone Parti Socialiste (PS) and former Deputy Prime Minister, when it turned out that Cools had knowledge about the Agusta deal. An official investigation into the deal was started in January 1993, by judge Véronique Ancia, when a search warrant was issued for Agusta and its lobbyist Georges Cywie.

In January 1994, the Belgian Senate removed the immunity on the Minister-President of Wallonia, Guy Spitaels, and the minister , both from the PS, and members of the Walloon Government.

Guy Coëme, Deputy Prime Minister and Minister of Transportation for the PS resigned that same month. Frank Vandenbroucke, Minister of Foreign Affairs in the Federal Government for the Flemish Socialistische Partij (SP), resigned from his post in March 1994. Willy Claes, member of the SP and Secretary General of NATO, resigned on 20 October 1995.

Prosecution
A criminal trial was handled by the Court of Cassation, which is responsible for cases involving minister in function. The court had most of its verdicts ready on 23 December 1998. Willy Claes received a three-year probationary sentence and a five-year prohibition on running for public office. Guy Coëme and Guy Spitaels both received three-year probationary sentences with a five-year prohibition on running for public office. Serge Dassault, of the Dassault company, received an 18-month probationary sentence for bribery. 

In total, Agusta and Dassault paid more than 160 million francs (about 4 million euros) to the Parti Socialiste and Socialistische Partij in bribes.

Verdicts

The Parti Socialiste had to return 49 million francs in bribes, the Socialistische Partij 111 million francs. Claes, Coëme, Delanghe, Hermanus, Mangé, Puelinckx, Spitaels and Wallyn were also barred from running for political office, or working in the civil service, for five years.

European Court of Human Rights
After the verdicts were handed down, many of the convicted parties applied to the European Court of Human Rights (ECHR) to get the verdicts revoked, because the Court of Cassation in Belgium does not allow for an appeal process, which would have been in violation of the European Convention on Human Rights.

On 2 June 2005, the ECHR judged that in the case of the two ministers, Willy Claes and Guy Coëme, both men were given a lawful trial at the Court of Cassation. The trial of the five others who applied to the ECHR, Dassault, Hermanus, Delanghe, Puelinckx and Wallyn, at the Court of Cassation, was found to have contravened the European Convention on Human Rights, but their verdicts would stand nonetheless.

External links
ECHR judgment 

Agusta
Dassault Group
Political scandals in Belgium
Bribery scandals
Corruption in Europe
Criminal investigation
Military scandals
1990s in Belgium
Weapons trade
Trials in Belgium
Article 6 of the European Convention on Human Rights
European Court of Human Rights cases involving Belgium
1988 controversies
1993 controversies
1994 controversies
1995 controversies

1998 crimes in Belgium

20th-century scandals
Corruption in Belgium